Ishchenko is a gender-neutral Ukrainian surname that may refer to

 Alex Ishchenko (born 1964), Australian rules footballer
 Andrey Ishchenko (born 1981), Russian politician
 Ivan Ishchenko (born 1980), Ukrainian wrestler
 Mykhaylo Ishchenko (born 1950), Soviet handball goalkeeper
 Mykola Ischenko (born 1983), Ukrainian football player
 Natalia Ishchenko (born 1986), Russian competitor in synchronized swimming
 Oleg Ishchenko (born 1994), French rugby union footballer
 Oleksandr Ishchenko (born 1953), Ukrainian football player
 Pavlo Ishchenko (born 1992), Ukrainian-Israeli boxer
 Yan Ishchenko (born 1980), Russian football player

See also
 

Ukrainian-language surnames